Vinland Presbyterian Church is a historic church in Baldwin, Kansas.  Its Gothic Revival style building was constructed in 1879 and added to the National Register of Historic Places in 2003.

It was nominated for the National Register on basis of its Gothic Revival architecture, which includes a steep roof, pointed-arch windows, and tower.

References

External links

Historical information
 

Presbyterian churches in Kansas
Churches on the National Register of Historic Places in Kansas
Gothic Revival church buildings in Kansas
Churches completed in 1879
Churches in Douglas County, Kansas
Historic American Buildings Survey in Kansas
National Register of Historic Places in Douglas County, Kansas